Haft-e Tir Stadium is a  stadium on Babol, Iran. It is owned by the government Physical Education Organization and has a seating capacity of 5,000. Its primary tenant is Khoneh Be Khoneh Football Club.

Sports venues in Iran
Buildings and structures in Mazandaran Province